The 1992 Humboldt State Lumberjacks football team represented Humboldt State University during the 1992 NCAA Division II football season. Humboldt State competed in the Northern California Athletic Conference in 1992.

The 1992 Lumberjacks were led by second-year head coach Fred Whitmire. They played home games at the Redwood Bowl in Arcata, California. On the field, Humboldt State finished with a record of seven wins and four losses (7–4, 3–2 NCAC). The Lumberjacks outscored their opponents 292–261 for the season.

It was later determined the Humboldt State used an ineligible player in the first two non-conference victories. They were forced to forfeit those two wins, giving the team an adjusted record of five wins and six losses (5–6, 3–2 NCAC)

Schedule

Notes

References

Humboldt State
Humboldt State Lumberjacks football seasons
Humboldt State Lumberjacks football